Durga Mohan Das ( Durga Mohon Das; 1841–1897) was a Brahmo Samaj leader and a social reformer.

Early life 
Durga Mohan was born in a well-known Baidya family at Telirbagh, Bikrampur, Dhaka in Bengal, now part of Munshiganj District of Bangladesh. Bikrampur has a long historical and cultural trail since many centuries. In 12th Century it was the capital of Ballal Sena and Lakshmana Sena, Kings of Sena dynasty and since then considered as an important seat of learning and culture of Eastern India.

Durga Mohan's father Kashiswar was a government pleader in the court of Barishal, presently in Bangladesh. Kashiswar had three sons, Kali Mohan, Durga Mohan and Bhuban Mohan, and all of them became practicing lawyers at Calcutta High Court.

Barisal Brahmo Samaj

References

Bibliography

Shastri, Shibnath. (1903). রামতনু লাহিড়ী ও তৎকালীন বঙ্গসমাজ  (Ramtanu Lahiri O Tatkalin Banga Samaj) in Bengali,S. K . Lahiri & Co, Calcutta.

Sengipta, Subodh Chandra and Bose, Anjali, (ed) সংসদ বাঙালি চরিত্রাভিধান  (Sansad Bangali Charitabhidhan) - a biographical dictionary in Bengali. (2002). Sishu Sahitya Samsad Pvt. Ltd. Kolkata.

1841 births
1897 deaths
University of Calcutta alumni
19th-century Bengalis
Brahmos
Das family of Telirbagh
People from Munshiganj District
People from Bikrampur
Indian social reformers